Pak Li-sup (born 6 January 1944) is a North Korean football defender who played for North Korea in the 1966 FIFA World Cup. He also played for Amrokgang Sports Team.

References

1944 births
North Korean footballers
North Korea international footballers
Association football defenders
Amnokgang Sports Club players
1966 FIFA World Cup players
Living people